I Gusti Nyoman Lempad (1862?–1978) was a Balinese stone sculptor, architect (undagi in Balinese) and painter who built palaces and temples in Ubud and its neighboring villages. Lempad's exact birth date, as is the case for many Balinese of his time, is unknown. But he was married when Krakatoa erupted in 1883.

Lempad grew up under the creative guidance of his artist father.  From early in his life, he was acknowledged as an outstanding stone carver and architect.  His Saraswati water temple, standing not far from the Puri Lukisan Museum in Ubud, demonstrates his architectural and design skills.  In his later years, he produced hundreds of linear drawings of Balinese mythology and folklore. Lempad of Bali, a short documentary film produced by John Darling and Lorne Blair, tells the story of Lempad at the end of his life and his cremation ceremony.

He died on April 25, 1978, at his home in Ubud. He gathered his family and asked them to bathe him and then died. The Balinese believed that he chose the time of his death at the day that considered most holy.

Although he maintained a close friendship with foreign artists, including Rudolf Bonnet and Walter Spies, Lempad never compromised his distinctive identity as a Balinese artist, and one with a broad range of talents in many media: painting, sculpture and architecture.

Notes

References
 
 

Documentary film

19th-century Dutch East Indies people
20th-century Dutch East Indies people
20th-century Indonesian painters
Artists from Bali
Indonesian architects
Indonesian sculptors
Longevity claims
Indonesian Hindus
People from Gianyar Regency
1860s births
1978 deaths
Year of birth uncertain